Columnomyces is a genus of fungi in the family Laboulbeniaceae. A monotypic genus, it contains the single species Columnomyces ptomaphagi.

References

External links 

 Columnomyces at Index Fungorum

Laboulbeniaceae
Monotypic Laboulbeniomycetes genera
Laboulbeniales genera